The 2019 Korean Tour was the ninth season of the Korean Tour to carry Official World Golf Ranking points. The season consisted of 15 official events Three events are co-sanctioned with the Asian Tour, one of which was also co-sanctioned with the Japan Golf Tour. All the tournaments had prize funds of at least 500 million won (approximately US$500,000). Nine had prize funds of 1 billion won ($1,000,000) or more.

Schedule
The following table lists official events during the 2019 season.

Order of Merit
The Order of Merit was titled as the Genesis Points and was based on prize money won during the season, calculated using a points-based system. The leading player on the tour (not otherwise exempt) earned status to play on the 2020 European Tour.

Notes

References

External links

2019 Korean Tour
2019 in golf
2019 in South Korean sport